Bill Hennington (died 11 July 1964) was an Australian rules footballer who played with South Melbourne in the Victorian Football League (VFL).

Family
The son of George Hennington (1865-1907), and Isabella Sophia Hennington (1861-1907), née Remington, William Hennington was born at South Melbourne c.1891.

He married Annie Elizabeth Jane Gardener (c.1892-1960) in 1922.

Football
In May 1915 he was granted a clearance from South Melbourne to Leopold.

Notes

External links 

Year of birth missing
1964 deaths
Australian rules footballers from Victoria (Australia)
Sydney Swans players